Vickerman is a surname. Notable people with the surname include:

Barbara Vickerman (1933–1997), American politician
Daniel Vickerman (1979–2017), Australian rugby union footballer
Frank Vickerman, 19th-century English wool-processing factory owner
Jim Vickerman (1931–2021), American politician
Keith Vickerman (1933–2016), British zoologist
Richard Vickerman Taylor (1830–1914), English Anglican priest and historian
Rob Vickerman (born 1985), English rugby union footballer